Sehore Assembly constituency is one of the 230 assembly constituencies of Madhya Pradesh. It comes under Sehore district. It is a segment of Bhopal (Lok Sabha constituency).

Members of Legislative Assembly

References

Assembly constituencies of Madhya Pradesh
Sehore district